Odontophrynus monachus is a species of frogs in the family Odontophrynidae. The specific name monachus, derived from the Latin word for "monk", alludes to the type locality in the headwaters of the São Francisco River (="St. Francis River") and Francis of Assisi, known as a patron of the animals and of the environment.

Description
The snout is obtuse in profile. The parotoid glands are globose and pearl-shaped in shape. The dorsum is granulose. Dorsal ground colour (in preservative) is brown or olive-brown. There is a cream coloured inter-orbital bar.

The males have vocal sac and start calling at dusk. The advertisement call is composed of one to three multi-pulsed notes.

Habitat
Odontophrynus monachus has been collected from an area with many grass-covered swamps on dark, clayish soil, with small, slow rivulets and pools. These frogs were found near shallow temporary pools or on the border of pools formed in the rain drainage beds. The climate in the area is tropical and humid.

References

monachus
Endemic fauna of Brazil
Amphibians of Brazil
Frogs of South America
Amphibians described in 2012